The Journal of Postcolonial Writing (from 1973 to 2004 titled World Literature Written in English) is a peer-reviewed academic journal publishing work that examines the interface between the economic forces commodifying culture and postcolonial writing of the modern era. The journal also includes interviews and biographies of postcolonial academics and authors, short prose fiction, poetry, and book reviews.

Abstracting and indexing 
The journal is indexed by the American Humanities Index, the MLA International Bibliography, The Journal of Commonwealth Literature, and in AustLit: The Australian Literature Resource. The journal is a member of The Council of Editors of Learned Journals.

References

External links 
 

Literary magazines published in the United Kingdom
Postcolonial literature
Publications established in 1973
English-language journals
Taylor & Francis academic journals
5 times per year journals